The 1911 Vanderbilt Commodores football team represented Vanderbilt University in the 1911 college football season. It was Dan McGugin's 8th year as head coach. The team outscored its opponents 259 to 9, winning an undisputed Southern Intercollegiate Athletic Association (SIAA) title.

Edwin Pope's Football's Greatest Coaches notes: "A lightning-swift backfield of Lew Hardage, Wilson Collins, Ammie Sikes, and Ray Morrison pushed Vandy through 1911 with only a 9–8 loss to Michigan." The Atlanta Constitution voted Vanderbilt's the best backfield in the South. Morrison is considered one of the best quarterbacks in Vanderbilt's long history

Before the season
Vanderbilt prepared to face its most difficult schedule to date. The halfbacks and fullbacks were new, as Bill Neely and Bo Williams had graduated, and Kent Morrison was shifted to end. Lew Hardage transferred from Auburn and joined the team.

Schedule

Season summary

Week 1: Birmingham
The season opened with a 40–0 win over Birmingham on a slippery field. Ammie Sikes and Lew Hardage proved to be the stars of the game.

The starting lineup was Morrison: (left end), Freeland (left tackle), Metzger (left guard), Morgan (center), C. Brown (right guard), T. Brown (right tackle), E. Brown (right end). R. Morrison (quarterback), Hardage (left halfback), Collins (right halfback), and Doherty (fullback).

Week 2: Maryvillle
The next week, Vanderbilt defeated Maryville 46-0. Ewing Y. Freeland and Zeke Martin played well in the line, but above all the game's star was Tom Brown.

The starting lineup was: Morrison (left end), Freeland (left tackle), Metzger (left guard), Morgan (center), C. Brown (right guard), T. Brown (right tackle), E. Brown (right end). R. Morrison (quarterback), Hardage (left halfback), Collins (right halfback), and Doherty (fullback).

Week 3: Rose Poly
Vanderbilt won 33–0 over Rose Polytechnic, in a game harder than prior weeks. The Tennessean's Spick Hall remarked on Rose's defense, "They all played a vicious game and when they tackled they did it in the good old-fashion way—right from the shoulder."

The starting lineup was: Metzger (left end), Freeland (left tackle), Covington (left guard), Morgan (center), C. Brown (right guard), T. Brown (right tackle), E. Brown (right end). R. Morrison (quarterback), Hardage (left halfback), Collins (right halfback), and Sikes (fullback).

Week 4: Central University
Vanderbilt drubbed , 45–0. Central and Vanderbilt were both undefeated the previous year, and Central also had claimed a Southern title, on the grounds that Vanderbilt would not play them. Lew Hardage and Ray Morrison and Rabbi Robins all had two touchdowns each. Ammie Sikes  and Murrah had one each. The starting lineup was: Morrison (left end), Freeland (left tackle), Huffman (left guard), Morgan (center), C. Brown (right guard), Covington (right tackle), E. Brown (right end). R. Morrison (quarterback), Hardage (left halfback), Collins (right halfback), and Sikes (fullback).

Week 5: at Michigan

Sources:

The Michigan Wolverines defeated the Commodores 9 to 8. The game matched Michigan head coach Fielding H. Yost against his former player and brother-in-law, Dan McGugin. Because of the relationship between Yost and McGugin, the two teams played nine times between 1905 and 1923, with Michigan winning eight games and tying one.

Before the game, Coach Yost reminded reporters that Vanderbilt's 1911 team included the same veteran line that had held Yale scoreless in 1910. Yost predicted a hard game.

After a scoreless first half, Zach Curlin made a drop kick to put the Commodores up 3 to 0 in the third quarter. The Vanderbilt University Quarterly notes "when the score was 3 to 0 in our favor the situation in the Michigan grandstands was heartrending." Yost said after the game: "It was one of the most exciting games I have ever witnessed."

Michigan tied up the score with a field goal of its own, then Stanfield Wells scored a touchdown and Frederick L. Conklin kicked goal. Morrison scored a touchdown for Vanderbilt, but put too much energy into the kick-out and missed the crucial extra point.

Walter Eckersall served as the umpire and covered the game for the Chicago Daily Tribune.  Eckersall wrote that Michigan's offense suffered from "an air of overconfidence", its tackling was poor, and the team was completely fooled on forward passes. He opined that the game was a reversal for Michigan, which would need "vast improvement" to defeat Penn and Cornell.

The starting lineup was: Morrison (left end), Freeland (left tackle), Metzger (left guard), Morgan (center), C. Brown (right guard), T. Brown (right tackle), E. Brown (right end). R. Morrison (quarterback), Hardage (left halfback), Collins (right halfback), and Sikes (fullback).

Week 6: Georgia

Sources:

Vanderbilt easily defeated the Georgia Bulldogs 17–0 under a "cold, leaden sky" with splashes of rain. After a scoreless first quarter, Lew Hardage called for a fair-catch at Georgia's 28-yard line, starting Vanderbilt's first scoring drive. It ended with an Ammie Sikes touchdown from 2 yards out. Hardage ran around right end for 45 yards, down to the 17-yard line. Vanderbilt then worked the ball to the goal with an 8-yard pass from Hardage to Wilson Collins, followed by Ray Morrison going over for a 4-yard touchdown. On one play later in the period, Hardage's left shoulder and arm were badly sprained, threatening his status for the season.

In the third quarter, Morrison made 22 yards on a fake punt, Sikes went 35 yards through line. Sikes then made 5 more, Collins 1, and Morrison finished with a 4-yard touchdown.

The starting lineup was: K. Morrison (left end), Covington (left tackle), Metzger (left guard), Morgan (center), C. Brown (right guard), T. Brown (right tackle), E. Brown (right end), R. Morrison (quarterback), Hardage (left halfback), Collins (right halfback), and Sikes (fullback).

Week 7: Kentucky State College

Sources:

The Commodores beat Kentucky State College, 18–0. The Wildcats were expected to lose by a larger margin. The first touchdown came on "a pretty forward pass" from Robins to Nuck Brown. The next score came in the third quarter, on a 7-yard run from Ray Morrison. Just after the start of the fourth quarter, Zach Curlin made an 8-yard field goal. He later made another 10-yard field goal from a difficult angle. The starting lineup was: K. Morrison (left end), Covington (left tackle), Metzger (left guard), Morgan (center), C. Brown (right guard), T. Brown (right tackle), E. Brown (right end), R. Morrison (quarterback), Collins (left halfback), Robins (right halfback), and Sikes (fullback).

Week 8: Ole Miss

Sources:

Vanderbilt beat Ole Miss, 21–0, and claimed the championship of the South. "This was easily the greatest southern game of the season".

In the second quarter, a long trick pass was caught by Ammie Sikes, who ran to Ole Miss's 5-yard line. Ray Morrison then got the score. At one point Morrison had a 70-yard run. Zach Curlin later made a field goal. In the second half, Morrison ran 75 yards on a fake punt and went out of bounds at the 30-yard line. On the next play, Lew Hardage started around left end, then reversed right, and was again crowded out, reversing field back around left end. He seemed to break a tackle by every Ole Miss player. Vanderbilt scored a final touchdown in the last quarter.

The starting lineup was: K. Morrison (left end), Covington (left tackle), Metzger (left guard), Morgan (center), C. Brown (right guard), T. Brown (right tackle), E. Brown (right end), R. Morrison (quarterback), Collins (left halfback), Hardage (right halfback), and Sikes (fullback).

Week 9: Sewanee and Ty Cobb
Ty Cobb traveled to Nashville on the Monday of the week of the Sewanee game to act in the play The College Widow. Cobb watched the team practice and donned a Vanderbilt uniform to practice with the team during the week, including punts and drop-kicks. 

Sources:

Vanderbilt defeated the Sewanee Tigers 31 to 0. Vanderbilt's first score came on a 3-yard end run from Ray Morrison. In the next period, Will Metzger and Tom Brown blocked a kick. Brown then picked up the ball and ran it in for a touchdown. The next score came on a pass from Morrison to Hardage. After the half, Wilson Collins had a touchdown run over tackle. In the same period, Sewanee had a bad pass from center for a safety. In the final period, Collins had another touchdown behind tackle. Vanderbilt had 455 total yards to Sewanee's 69.

The starting lineup was: K. Morrison (left end), Freeland (left tackle), Metzger (left guard), Morgan (center), C. Brown (right guard), T. Brown (right tackle), E. Brown (right end), Morrison (quarterback), Curlin (right halfback), Hardage (left halfback), and Sikes (fullback). The umpire was Ted Coy.

Post season

Awards and honors
Vanderbilt claimed an undisputed SIAA and Southern title. "Usually Texas and Arkansas have entered strong claims for the coveted honor, but little Sewanee this year disposed of Texas and in turn Texas disposed of Arkansas." The Atlanta Constitution voted Vanderbilt's the best backfield in the South.

Ewing Freeland, Will Metzger, Hugh Morgan, Morrison, and Hardage were all consensus All-Southern selections. Morrison is considered one of the best quarterbacks in Vanderbilt's long history. He won Bachelor of Ugliness for the class of 1912, and both Morrison and Metzger were later selected for an Associated Press Southeast Area All-Time football team 1869–1919 era.

Departures
Assistant coach Dr. Owsley Manier left the team to spend the winter of 1911 practicing medicine at the University of Pennsylvania Hospital. As well as Morrison graduating, Freeland went to Texas and Metzger entered into business.

Players

Depth chart
The following chart provides a visual depiction of Vanderbilt's lineup during the 1911 season with games started at the position reflected in parenthesis. The chart mimics a short punt formation while on offense, with the quarterback under center.

Varsity letter winners
"Wearers of the V"

Line

Backfield

Substitutes

Coaching staff
Dan McGugin, head coach
Owsley Manier, assistant
Sam Costen, assistant
Frank Gilliland, manager

See also
1911 College Football All-Southern Team
1911 Southern Intercollegiate Athletic Association football season

Notes

References

Bibliography
 
 

Vanderbilt
Vanderbilt Commodores football seasons
Vanderbilt Commodores football